Othaya Constituency is an electoral constituency in Kenya. It is one of six constituencies in Nyeri County. Othaya Constituency comprises Othaya division of Nyeri County.
The constituency was established for the 1966 elections.

Othaya is the main town located in this constituency. Mwai Kibaki, the former president of Kenya, has been the Othaya MP since 1974. Earlier he had been the MP of Doonholm Constituency (now Makadara).

Members of Parliament

Locations and wards

References

External links 
Map of the constituency
Uchaguzikenya.com - Constituency profile

Constituencies in Nyeri County
Constituencies in Central Province (Kenya)
1966 establishments in Kenya
Constituencies established in 1966